The Czech Republic competed at the 2016 Summer Olympics in Rio de Janeiro, Brazil, from 5 to 21 August 2016. This was the nation's sixth consecutive appearance at the Summer Olympics after splitting from the former Czechoslovakia. The Czech team consisted of 105 athletes, 63 men and 42 women, across twenty sports.

Czech Republic returned home from Rio de Janeiro with a total of 10 medals (1 gold, 2 silver, and 7 bronze), marking the country's second-most successful Olympics, behind tallies of 11 achieved at Atlanta 1996 and London 2012. Three of the medals were awarded to the Czech squad in canoeing and tennis, while the rest to the competitors in judo, track and field, mountain biking, and rowing.

Among the medalists were 2014 world judo champion Lukáš Krpálek, who captured the country's only gold medal in the men's half-heavyweight division (100 kg), and rower Ondřej Synek, who managed to add a bronze to his Olympic career treasury of two silvers in the men's single sculls. Flatwater canoeist and two-time world champion Josef Dostál contributed two of the country's medals, picking up a silver in the K-1 1000 m, and a bronze as a member of the Czech crew in the kayak four, his second consecutive medal in that event. Despite witnessing her three-peat bid come to an end with a bronze at the Games, double Olympic champion Barbora Špotáková cemented her place in history as the first woman to score three medals in the javelin throw. Mountain biker Jaroslav Kulhavý closed out the nation's Olympic campaign by taking home the silver medal in the men's cross-country race, losing his title defense to Switzerland's Nino Schurter.

Medalists

The following Czech competitors won medals at the Games. In the by discipline sections below, medalists' names are bolded.

Competitors
Czech Olympic Committee fielded a roster of 105 athletes, 63 men and 42 women, to compete across twenty sports at these Games; it was the nation's smallest delegation sent to the Olympics since the breakup of the former Czechoslovakia. Moreover, Czech Republic did not send teams in any of the collective sports for the first time in the nation's Olympic history.

Of the 105 participants, sixty of them attended at least a single Olympiad, with the rest making their debut in Rio de Janeiro. Track and field accounted for the largest number of athletes on the team with 25 entries. Golf, artistic gymnastics, triathlon, weightlifting, and wrestling all had a single competitor.

Thirteen of the nation's past Olympic medalists returned, including four defending champions from London 2012: javelin thrower Barbora Špotáková, modern pentathlete David Svoboda, single sculls rower Miroslava Knapková, and mountain biker Jaroslav Kulhavý. 2008 trap shooting champion David Kostelecký, synchronized swimmer Soňa Bernardová, and former cross-country skier Kateřina Nash in mountain biking headed the full roster of Czech athletes by participating in their fifth Olympics as the most experienced competitors. They were followed by Knapková, Špotakova, Kulhavý, long-distance and open water swimmer Jana Pechanová, double rowing medalist Ondřej Synek in the men's single sculls, and high jumper and 2004 bronze medalist Jaroslav Bába, all of whom vied for their fourth straight Games.

Other notable athletes on the Czech roster included reigning silver medalists Andrea Hlaváčková and Lucie Hradecká in the women's tennis doubles, 2012 bronze medalist and double world champion Zuzana Hejnová in the women's 400 m hurdles, and 2014 world judo champion Lukáš Krpálek, who was selected to be the country's flag bearer in the opening ceremony.

Rifle shooting rookie Filip Nepejchal and freestyle swimming teen Barbora Seemanová, both of whom competing under 18, were Czech Republic's youngest competitors, with Kostelecký rounding out the field as the oldest member (aged 41). Double canoeing champion Martin Doktor served as the team's chef de mission for the Games.

| width=78% align=left valign=top |
The following is the list of number of competitors participating in the Games:

Athletics
 
Czech athletes have so far achieved qualifying standards in the following athletics events (up to a maximum of 3 athletes in each event):

Key
Note–Ranks given for track events are within the athlete's heat only
Q = Qualified for the next round
q = Qualified for the next round as a fastest loser or, in field events, by position without achieving the qualifying target
NR = National record
N/A = Round not applicable for the event
Bye = Athlete not required to compete in round
NM = No mark

Track & road events
Men

Women

Field events
Men

Women

Combined events
Men's decathlon

Women's heptathlon

Badminton

The Czech Republic has qualified two badminton players for each of the following events into the Olympic tournament. Remarkably going to their third Olympics, Kristína Gavnholt was selected among the top 34 individual shuttlers in the women's singles based on the BWF World Rankings as of 5 May 2016, while her counterpart Petr Koukal picked up one of the spare athlete berths from the doubles as the next highest-ranked eligible player in the men's singles.

Canoeing

Slalom
Czech canoeists have qualified a maximum of one boat in each of the following classes through the 2015 ICF Canoe Slalom World Championships. The roster of Czech slalom canoeists will be announced on 15 May 2016 as a result of their top performances at three selection meets of the Olympic Trials: two domestic races in Veltrusy ( 16 to 17 April) and Prague ( 23 to 24 April) and the European Championships ( 13 to 15 May) in Liptovský Mikuláš, Slovakia.

Sprint
Czech canoeists have qualified a total of four boats in each of the following distances for the Games through the 2015 ICF Canoe Sprint World Championships. Meanwhile, one additional boat was awarded to the Czech squad in men's C-2 1000 m by virtue of a top two national finish at the 2016 European Qualification Regatta in Duisburg, Germany.

The sprint canoeing team, led by London 2012 bronze medalist Josef Dostál in the men's kayak four, was named to the Olympic roster on 7 June 2016.

Men

Qualification Legend: FA = Qualify to final (medal); FB = Qualify to final B (non-medal)

Cycling

Road
Czech riders qualified for a maximum of four quota places in the men's Olympic road race by virtue of their top 15 final national ranking in the 2015 UCI World and Europe Tour. The men's road cycling team was named to the Olympic roster on 23 June 2016.

Track
Following the completion of the 2016 UCI Track Cycling World Championships, Czech riders failed to win a quota place in the men's team sprint, but they did manage to accumulate a single berth in the men's keirin and two in the men's sprint, by virtue of their final individual UCI Olympic rankings in those events.

Sprint

Keirin

Mountain biking
Czech mountain bikers qualified for three men's quota places into the Olympic cross-country race, as a result of the nation's fourth-place finish in the UCI Olympic Ranking List of 25 May 2016. Due to the lack of eligible NOCs for Africa on the list, the unused berth was added to the Czech mountain biking team as the next highest-ranked nation, not yet qualified, in the women's cross-country race. The mountain biking team, highlighted by reigning Olympic men's cross-country champion Jaroslav Kulhavý, was announced on 24 May 2016.

Fencing

The Czech Republic has entered two fencers into the Olympic competition. 2010 Youth Olympian Alexander Choupenitch secured a spot in the men's foil as one of the two highest-ranked fencers coming from the European zone in the FIE Adjusted Official Rankings. Meanwhile, Jiří Beran rounded out the Czech fencing roster as the sole winner of the men's épée at the European Zonal Qualifier in Prague.

Golf 

Czech Republic has entered one golfer into the Olympic tournament. Klára Spilková (world no. 279) qualified directly among the top 60 eligible players for the women's event based on the IGF World Rankings as of 11 July 2016.

Gymnastics

Artistic
The Czech Republic has entered one artistic gymnast into the Olympic competition. David Jessen, son of 1988 Olympian Hana Říčná, claimed his Olympic spot in the men's apparatus and all-around events at the Olympic Test Event in Rio de Janeiro.

Men

Judo

The Czech Republic has qualified three judokas for each of the following weight classes at the Games. London 2012 Olympian Lukáš Krpálek and returnee Pavel Petřikov were ranked among the top 22 eligible judokas for men in the IJF World Ranking List of 30 May 2016, while Jaromír Ježek at men's lightweight (73 kg) earned a continental quota spot from the European region as the Czech Republic's top-ranked judoka outside of direct qualifying position.

Modern pentathlon
 
Czech athletes have qualified for the following spots to compete in modern pentathlon. Defending Olympic champion David Svoboda and rookie Jan Kuf secured a selection in the men's event by gaining two of the eight Olympic slots reserved for their team from the 2015 European Championships. Meanwhile, Barbora Kodedová granted an invitation from UIPM to compete in the women's event, as one of the next highest-ranked eligible modern pentathletes, not yet qualified, in the World Rankings as of 1 June 2016.

Rowing

The Czech Republic has qualified a total of five boats for each of the following rowing classes into the Olympic regatta. Three rowing crews confirmed Olympic places for their boats each in both the men's and women's single sculls, and men's lightweight four at the 2015 FISA World Championships in Lac d'Aiguebelette, France, while the rowers competing in the men's pair and women's double sculls were added to the Czech roster with their top two finish at the 2016 European & Final Qualification Regatta in Lucerne, Switzerland.

Men

Women

Qualification Legend: FA=Final A (medal); FB=Final B (non-medal); FC=Final C (non-medal); FD=Final D (non-medal); FE=Final E (non-medal); FF=Final F (non-medal); SA/B=Semifinals A/B; SC/D=Semifinals C/D; SE/F=Semifinals E/F; QF=Quarterfinals; R=Repechage

Sailing
 
Czech sailors have qualified one boat in each of the following classes through the 2014 ISAF Sailing World Championships, the individual fleet Worlds, and European qualifying regattas.

M = Medal race; EL = Eliminated – did not advance into the medal race

Shooting
 
Czech shooters have achieved quota places for the following events by virtue of their best finishes at the 2014 and 2015 ISSF World Championships, the 2015 ISSF World Cup series, and European Championships or Games, as long as they obtained a minimum qualifying score (MQS) by 31 March 2016.

Qualification Legend: Q = Qualify for the next round; q = Qualify for the bronze medal (shotgun)

Swimming
 
Czech swimmers have so far achieved qualifying standards in the following events (up to a maximum of 2 swimmers in each event at the Olympic Qualifying Time (OQT), and potentially 1 at the Olympic Selection Time (OST)):

Men

Women

Synchronized swimming

The Czech Republic has fielded a squad of two synchronized swimmers to compete only in the women's duet by virtue of their ninth-place finish at the FINA Olympic test event in Rio de Janeiro.

Table tennis

The Czech Republic has entered four athletes into the table tennis competition at the Games. London 2012 Olympian Iveta Vacenovská was automatically selected among the top 22 eligible players in the women's singles based on the ITTF Olympic Rankings. Meanwhile, Lubomír Jančařík, Dmitrij Prokopcov, and Hana Matelová granted their invitations from ITTF to compete in each of their respective singles events as one of the next seven highest-ranked eligible players, not yet qualified, on the Olympic Ranking List.

Tennis

The Czech Republic has entered eight tennis players (two men and six women) into the Olympic tournament. Tomáš Berdych (world no. 8) and Jiří Veselý (world no. 67) qualified directly for the men's singles as two of the top 56 eligible players in the ATP World Rankings, while Petra Kvitová (world no. 11), Karolína Plíšková (world no. 17), Lucie Šafářová (world no. 29), and Barbora Strýcová (world no. 30) did so for the women's singles based on their WTA World Rankings as of 6 June 2016.

Having been directly entered to the singles, Berdych and Veselý also opted to play with their partners Radek Štěpánek and Lukáš Rosol, respectively, in the men's doubles. Meanwhile, reigning silver medalists Andrea Hlaváčková and Lucie Hradecká teamed up together for their second Olympic stint in the women's doubles by virtue of the latter's top-10 WTA ranking.

On 16 July 2016, Berdych and Plíšková announced that both of them withdrew from the Games due to personal and family concerns on Zika virus. Instead, Rosol (world no. 71) took over Berdych's place in the men's singles and doubles. On 27 July 2016, Veselý joined them as one of the Czech tennis players to be pulled out from the Games, citing chest pains.

Men

Women

Mixed

Triathlon
 
The Czech Republic has entered one triathlete to compete at the Games. Two-time Olympian Vendula Frintová was ranked among the top 40 eligible triathletes in the women's event based on the ITU Olympic Qualification List as of 15 May 2016.

Volleyball

Beach
The Czech Republic women's beach volleyball team qualified directly for the Olympics by virtue of their top two national finish at the 2016 FIVB Continental Cup in Sochi, Russia. The place was awarded to London 2012 Olympian Markéta Sluková and her rookie partner Barbora Hermannová.

Weightlifting

The Czech Republic has qualified one male weightlifter for the Rio Olympics by virtue of a top seven national finish at the 2016 European Championships. The team must allocate this place by 20 June 2016.

Wrestling
 
The Czech Republic has received a spare host berth freed up by Brazil as the next highest-ranked eligible nation, not yet qualified, to send a wrestler competing in the women's freestyle 63 kg to the Olympics, based on the results from the World Championships.
Key:
 VT – Victory by Fall.
 PP – Decision by Points – the loser with technical points.
 PO – Decision by Points – the loser without technical points.
 ST – Technical superiority – the loser without technical points and a margin of victory of at least 8 (Greco-Roman) or 10 (freestyle) points.

Women's freestyle

See also
Czech Republic at the 2016 Summer Paralympics

References

External links 

 Czech Olympic Team – Rio 2016 Olympic Coverage 
 

Olympics
2016
Nations at the 2016 Summer Olympics